Dr. Tobias Abse is a historian. He was a lecturer in the subject at Goldsmiths College of the University of London from 1994 to 2016. Abse has written extensively on the rise of the Fascist Right in Italy prior to World War II. He has been a member of the Socialist Alliance National Executive, the Alliance for Green Socialism National Committee, the Socialist History Society committee and the Revolutionary History editorial board and is a regular contributor to UK socialist newspapers and magazines.

Abse is the son of the Labour MP and social reformer Leo Abse (1917–2008). He was educated at William Ellis School, Highgate, and Gonville and Caius College, Cambridge, where he graduated with a double-starred first-class degree in History in 1978.

Publications
Abse, Toby. 2007. The Moro Affair: Interpretations and Consequences. In: S. Gundle and L. Rinaldi, eds. Assassinations and Murder in Modern Italy Transformations in Society and Culture. Palgrave MacMillan, pp. 89–100.  
Abse, Toby. 2006. Catholic-Jewish Relations in Italy from Unification to the Second Vatican Council (1870-1965). In: Philip J. Broadhead and Damien V. Keown, eds. Can Faiths Make Peace? Holy Wars and the Resolution of Religious Conflicts. I.B Tauris, pp. 107–123. 
Abse, Toby. 2005. Italy's Long Road to Austerity and the Paradoxes of Communism. In: B. Moss, ed. Monetary Union in Crisis: The European Union as a Neo-Liberal Construction. Palgrave Macmillan, pp. 249–265. 
Abse, Toby. 2003. Palmiro Togliatti, Loyal Servant of Stalin. In: K. Flett and D. Renton, eds. New Approaches to Socialist History. New Clarion Press, pp. 30–48.

References

Living people
British Marxist historians
People educated at William Ellis School
Alumni of Gonville and Caius College, Cambridge
Year of birth missing (living people)
Academics of Goldsmiths, University of London
Welsh Jews
British people of Polish-Jewish descent
Tobias